Giddings Road Bridge is a covered bridge spanning Mill Creek in Jefferson Township, Ashtabula County, Ohio, United States. The bridge, one of currently 16 drivable bridges in the county, is a single span Pratt truss design, built with funding from an ODOT Timber Grant. The bridge’s WGCB number is 35-04-62, and it is located approximately 2.7 mi (4.3 km) northeast of Jefferson.

History
1995 – Bridge constructed

Dimensions
Length: 107 feet (32.6 m)

Gallery

See also
List of Ashtabula County covered bridges

References

External links
Ohio Covered Bridges List
Ohio Covered Bridge Homepage
The Covered Bridge Numbering System
Ohio Historic Bridge Association
Giddings Road Covered Bridge from Ohio Covered Bridges, Historic Bridges

Covered bridges in Ashtabula County, Ohio
Bridges completed in 1995
Road bridges in Ohio
Wooden bridges in Ohio
Pratt truss bridges in the United States